Oak Grove is an Unincorporated community in Jones County, North Carolina, United  States, located on US 17, southwest of New Bern. Oak Grove Holf Airport is nearby.

References

Unincorporated communities in Jones County, North Carolina
Unincorporated communities in North Carolina